Estradiol sulfate (E2S), or 17β-estradiol 3-sulfate, is a natural, endogenous steroid and an estrogen ester. E2S itself is biologically inactive, but it can be converted by steroid sulfatase (also called estrogen sulfatase) into estradiol, which is a potent estrogen. Simultaneously, estrogen sulfotransferases convert estradiol to E2S, resulting in an equilibrium between the two steroids in various tissues. Estrone and E2S are the two immediate metabolic sources of estradiol. E2S can also be metabolized into estrone sulfate (E1S), which in turn can be converted into estrone and estradiol. Circulating concentrations of E2S are much lower than those of E1S. High concentrations of E2S are present in breast tissue, and E2S has been implicated in the biology of breast cancer via serving as an active reservoir of estradiol.

As the sodium salt, sodium estradiol sulfate, E2S is present as a minor constituent (0.9%) of conjugated equine estrogens (CEEs), or Premarin. It effectively functions as a prodrug to estradiol in this preparation, similarly to E1S. E2S is also formed as a metabolite of estradiol, as well as of estrone and E1S. Aside from its presence in CEEs, E2S is not available as a commercial pharmaceutical drug.

E2S shows about 10,000-fold lower potency in activating the estrogen receptors relative to estradiol in vitro. It is 10-fold less potent than estrone sulfate orally in terms of in vivo uterotrophic effect in rats. Estrogen sulfates like estradiol sulfate or estrone sulfate are about twice as potent as the corresponding free estrogens in terms of estrogenic effect when given orally to rodents. This in part led to the introduction of conjugated estrogens (Premarin), which are primarily estrone sulfate, in 1941.

Although inactive at steroid hormone receptors, E2S has been found to act as a potent inhibitor of glutathione S-transferase, an enzyme that contributes to the inactivation of estradiol via conversion of it into an estradiol-glutathione conjugate. As such, E2S can indirectly serve as a positive effector of estrogen signaling.

Estradiol levels are about 1.5- to 4-fold higher than E2S levels in women. This is in contrast to E1S, the levels of which are about 10 to 15 times higher than those of estrone.

E2S at an oral dosage of 5 mg/day in women resulted in inhibition of ovulation in 89% of cycles (47 of 53).

See also
 Catechol estrogen
 DHEA sulfate
 Estradiol glucuronide
 Estriol sulfate
 Estrogen conjugate
 Lipoidal estradiol
 Pregnenolone sulfate
 List of estrogen esters § Estradiol esters

References

Estradiol esters
Human metabolites
Phenol esters
Sulfate esters